Placodonts ("Tablet teeth") are an extinct order of marine reptiles that lived during the Triassic period, becoming extinct at the end of the period. They were part of Sauropterygia, the group that includes plesiosaurs.

The first specimen was discovered in 1830. They have been found throughout central Europe, North Africa, the Middle East and China.

Palaeobiology

The earliest forms, like Placodus, which lived in the early to middle Triassic, resembled barrel-bodied lizards superficially similar to the marine iguana of today, but larger. In contrast to the marine iguana, which feeds on algae, the placodonts ate molluscs and so their teeth were flat and tough to crush shells. In the earliest periods, their size was probably enough to keep away the top sea predators of the time: the sharks. However, as time passed, other kinds of carnivorous reptiles began to colonize the seas, such as ichthyosaurs and nothosaurs, and later placodonts developed bony plates on their backs to protect their bodies while feeding. By the Late Triassic, these plates had grown so much that placodonts of the time, such as Henodus and Placochelys, resembled the sea turtles of the modern day more than their ancestors without bony plates. Other placodonts, like Psephoderma, developed plates as well, but in a different articulated manner that resembled the carapace of horseshoe crabs more than those of sea turtles. All these adaptations can be counted as perfect examples of convergent evolution, as placodonts were not related to any of these animals.

Because of their dense bone and heavy armour plating, these creatures would have been too heavy to float in the ocean and would have used a lot of energy to reach the water surface. For this reason, and because of the type of sediment found accompanying their fossils, it is suggested that they lived in shallow waters and not in deep oceans.

Their diet consisted of marine bivalves, brachiopods, and other invertebrates. They were notable for their large, flat, often protruding teeth, which they used to crush the molluscs and brachiopods that they hunted on the sea bed (another way in which they were similar to walruses). The palate teeth were adapted for this durophagous diet, being extremely thick and large enough to crush thick shell.

Henodus, however, differs from other placodonts in having developed unique baleen-like denticles, which alongside features of the hyoid and jaw musculature suggest that it was a filter feeder. Recent comparisons to Atopodentatus suggest that it was a herbivore as well, bearing a similar broad jaw shape, albeit it obtained plant matter through filter-feeding it from the substrates. The group was once believed to be restricted to the western Tethys, but the discovery of Sinocyamodus xinpuensis in China overturned this view.

Classification
 Class Reptilia
 Superorder Sauropterygia
 Order Placodontia
 Genus Atopodentatus?
 Genus Pararcus
 Superfamily Placodontoidea
 Family Paraplacodontidae
 Genus Paraplacodus
 Family Placodontidae
 Genus Placodus
 Superfamily Cyamodontoidea
 Genus Sinocyamodus
 Genus Psephosauriscus
 Genus Psephosaurus
 Family Henodontidae
 Genus Henodus
 Genus Parahenodus
 Family Cyamodontidae
 Genus Cyamodus
 Genus Protenodontosaurus
 Family Placochelyidae
 Genus Glyphoderma
 Genus Placochelys
 Genus Psephosauriscus
 Genus Psephochelys
 Genus Psephoderma

Additionally, the name Placodontiformes was erected for the clade that includes Palatodonta and Placodontia. Palatodonta, from the early Middle Triassic of the Netherlands, was a marine sauropterygian that was very similar to placodonts, but Palatodonta has teeth that are small and pointed instead of broad and flat.

The clade Helveticosauroidea was previously considered to be a basal superfamily of placodonts with the sole member Helveticosaurus. However, it is now thought that Helveticosaurus was not a placodont but possibly an unusual member of the Archosauromorpha.

Phylogeny 
The cladogram below follows the result found by Rainer Schoch and Hans-Dieter Sues in 2015.

References

Sources

External links
The Triassic World
Palaeos
Oceans of Kansas Palaeontology Mike Everhart
Mikko's Phylogeny Archive

 
Late Triassic extinctions
Carnian first appearances